The rough gecko (Naultinus rudis) is a species of gecko in the family Gekkonidae native to New Zealand. It is endemic to the  Kaikoura Ranges.

Conservation status 

As of 2012 the Department of Conservation (DOC) classified the Rough gecko as Nationally Vulnerable under the New Zealand Threat Classification System.

References

Naultinus
Reptiles of New Zealand
Reptiles described in 1882
Taxa named by Johann Gustav Fischer
Taxonomy articles created by Polbot